Weygers is a surname. Notable people with the surname include:

Alexander Weygers (1901–1989), Dutch-American artist and writer
Marian Weygers (1909–2008), American printmaker

See also
Weyers